Fish Springs (formerly, Tinemaha and Tinnemaha) is a set of springs in Inyo County, California.

A post office operated at Fish Springs during part of 1866, and from 1868 to 1876. A post office operated at Tinnemaha from 1895 to 1910. Tinemaha is the name of a legendary Piute of the region.

The Tinemaha Reservoir, of the Los Angeles Aqueduct system, is located nearby.

References

Reference bibliography 

Unincorporated communities in Inyo County, California
Unincorporated communities in California